Phaeosphaeria avenaria f.sp. triticae is a plant pathogen infecting barley and wheat.

References

External links
 USDA ARS Fungal Database

Fungal plant pathogens and diseases
Barley diseases
Wheat diseases
Phaeosphaeriaceae
Forma specialis taxa
Fungi described in 1874